Carlos Luciano Araujo (born November 19, 1981) is a retired Argentine football player, who played as a right-back.

Career

Araujo started his career with Independiente Rivadavia. He then played for Atlético de Rafaela, with which he won 2002–03 season of the Primera B Nacional (second division), earning promotion to the Primera Division. Subsequently, he played for major Argentine clubs, including Estudiantes de La Plata, Newell's Old Boys and Huracán. After a successful season with Huracán, Araujo decided to take the big step to Europe in the second half of 2009, joining Greek club AEK Athens F.C. Araujo was cited as the "best right back in Argentina" by his former Huracán coach Ángel Cappa, whilst his transfer was described by a journalist as a "key player loss" for Huracán.

Araujo signed a 3-year contract with AEK Athens on August 18, 2009. AEK signed Araujo as a free agent. Araujo was the fifth Argentine AEK Athens player for the 2009–10 season, the others being Sebastián Saja, Ignacio Scocco, Nicolás Bianchi Arce and Ismael Blanco. Although good performances in Greece and Europe, Araujo had to return to Argentina due to a sudden family issue in July 2010. Ηe left AEK Athens after the conflicts between him and the team were close to lead to court. He was loaned the remaining year of his contract in Lanus having previously denied a loan offer from Independiente Rivadavia despite pressure from AEK Athens.

On December 23, 2010, Araujo returned to Argentina, joining Lanús.

Honours
Lanús
Copa Sudamericana: 2013

References

External links
 Carlos Araujo at BDFA.com.ar 
 
 

1981 births
Living people
Argentine footballers
Argentine expatriate footballers
Sportspeople from Mendoza Province
Argentine people of Galician descent
Association football defenders
Argentina under-20 international footballers
Argentine Primera División players
Atlético de Rafaela footballers
Racing Club de Avellaneda footballers
Estudiantes de La Plata footballers
Newell's Old Boys footballers
Club Atlético Huracán footballers
Independiente Rivadavia footballers
Club Atlético Lanús footballers
Club Olimpo footballers
Super League Greece players
AEK Athens F.C. players
Argentine expatriate sportspeople in Greece
Expatriate footballers in Greece